The Bucksbaum Institute for Clinical Excellence, established in 2011, is a foundation with an emphasis on improving the doctor–patient relationship through patient care, teaching and research at the University of Chicago Medicine.

It was made by a gift of $42 million from the Matthew and Carolyn Bucksbaum Family Foundation. Dr Mark Siegler is the establishing chief.

Core areas 
The institute has four core goals:

To promote the practice of Shared decision-making in medicine

To advance social justice by reducing health disparities

To build & promote compassionate medical students and physicians.

To focus on the social sciences and humanities, that are frequently disregarded by conventional clinical school programs.

Bucksbaum Institute scholars range from premedical undergraduates, faculty scholars, senior physicians, master clinicians to International scholars who champion the cause of shared decision making; and apply clinical medical ethics as the standard of care to reduce health disparities.

References

External links
 

Non-profit organizations based in Chicago
Ethics organizations
Bioethics research organizations
Think tanks based in the United States